The Boys & Girls Guide to Getting Down is a 2006 American comedy film directed by Paul Sapiano. The film had its world premiere in the Guilty Pleasures section at the 2006 Los Angeles Film Festival on June 25, 2006. It was released in the United States on March 23, 2007.

Plot
Part documentary, part narrative, part instructional format, the film aims to teach young inexperienced youth about all things involved with "getting down", while also pointing out some of the pitfalls associated with the party lifestyle.

Cast

Release
The film had its world premiere in the Guilty Pleasures section at the 2006 Los Angeles Film Festival on June 25, 2006. It was released in the United States on March 23, 2007.

Reception
On review aggregator website Rotten Tomatoes, the film holds an approval rating of 100% based on 5 reviews, with a weighted average rating of 7.2/10.

Robert Koehler of Variety stated that "[the film's] rough production values and flubbed comedy contrast with the amusing and plentiful voice-over narration and the dazzling graphic design that suggests Peter Max on ecstasy." Ted Fry of The Seattle Times wrote: "There are a few laughs, but most of the characters in the loosely connected series of sketches are such venal, vile creatures that it's hard to imagine identifying with them even on a jokey or cartoonish level."

References

External links
 
 

2006 films
American comedy films
American documentary films
2000s English-language films
2000s American films